Parvaroa is a genus of tussock moths in the family Erebidae.

Species
The following species are included in the genus.
Parvaroa cinerea Holloway, 1976
Parvaroa obscura Holloway, 1999
Parvaroa shelfordi Collenette, 1932
Parvaroa tisdala Swinhoe, 1903

References

Natural History Museum Lepidoptera genus database

Lymantriinae
Moth genera